Flight 75 may refer to:

Capital Airlines Flight 75, crashed on May 12, 1959
Aerolift Philippines Flight 75, crashed on 18 May 1990

0075